The 1977 Brown Bears football team was an American football team that represented Brown University during the 1977 NCAA Division I football season. A year after its first Ivy League championship, Brown dropped to second place. 

In their third season under head coach John Anderson, the Bears compiled a 7–2 record and outscored opponents 173 to 96. Louis Cole and B. Hill were the team captains. 

The Bears' 5–2 conference record placed second in the Ivy League standings. They outscored Ivy opponents 101 to 73. 

Brown played its home games at Brown Stadium in Providence, Rhode Island.

Schedule

References

Brown
Brown Bears football seasons
Brown Bears football